James B. Adams is a President's Professor at Arizona State University, where he directs the autism/Asperger's research program, though he originally taught chemical and materials engineering there. Adams also holds a post at the Southwest College of Naturopathic Medicine. He is also the president of the Autism Society of Greater Phoenix, the co-chair of the Autism Research Institute's scientific advisory committee, and has received the Autism Service Award from the Greater Phoenix chapter of the Autism Society of America. He has been featured on Dateline NBC, and received a National Science Foundation Presidential Young Investigator Award from President George Bush in 1996.

Education

Adams has a bachelor's degree from Duke University in physics (1984), as well an MS (1986) and a PhD (1987) in materials engineering from the University of Wisconsin-Madison.

Career

Adams was formerly an assistant, and later associate, professor of engineering at the University of Illinois at Urbana-Champaign from 1989 to 1996, whereupon he became an associate professor at ASU. He became a full professor in 1998.

Research

Engineering

Adams' team at ASU works in the field of computational and materials science, studying semiconductor processing and the ideal coatings for tools used for aluminum processing using computer simulations, as well as silicon thin-film cells. In 2012, he was elected a Fellow of ASM International – The Materials Information Society.

Autism

Adams has hypothesized that heavy metals, particularly cadmium and mercury, may play a role in the pathogenesis of autism, and has advocated treatment with chelation therapy and pioglitazone. Adams further contends that elevated testosterone levels are linked to the depletion of glutathione, which in turn results in increased susceptibility to toxic metals, citing a study published by Simon Baron-Cohen, which contains "major logical and factual flaws" according to some autism experts. Adams was on the scientific advisory board of the International Academy of Oral Medicine and Toxicology, a group that publicizes the purported dangers of dental amalgam despite some evidence to the contrary. Adams also states that children with autism have an increased need for certain vitamins and minerals.

In 2019, Adams and a group of researchers published a study which stated that microbiota transfer therapy (MTT) has a major success with people who have autism.

Controversial opinions

In a 2006 NBC News interview, Adams noted that acrodynia, a condition that afflicted children roughly a hundred years ago, was found to be caused by mercury-containing teething powders, and that "symptoms of acrodynia were pretty similar to symptoms of autism". However, multiple sources, including a paper published in the medical journal Pediatrics, have noted major differences between the symptoms of mercury poisoning and those of autism.

In 2016, Adams came under fire for posting an advertisement for the widely criticized anti-vaccine film Vaxxed on one of ASU's official Facebook pages. Adams subsequently edited the post to include a disclaimer that the movie "represents only one side of the MMR-vaccine controversy", and admitted that he had not actually seen it. He later deleted the post altogether at ASU's request, but continued to promote the film in his capacity as president of the Autism Society of Greater Phoenix. While declining to describe himself as “anti-vaccine", Adams told a reporter that he does believe vaccines, in “rare cases”, may cause autism—despite a 20-year accumulation of scientific evidence to the contrary.

Personal life

Adams and his wife, Marie, have three children. He became interested in autism when his daughter, Kim, was diagnosed with the disorder in 1994; he has stated he suspects this occurred because of her vaccinations and stopped vaccinating her after her autism diagnosis.

Selected publications

Engineering

Autism

References

External links 

American materials scientists
Arizona State University faculty
Autism researchers
Duke University Trinity College of Arts and Sciences alumni
Living people
University of Wisconsin–Madison College of Engineering alumni
Year of birth missing (living people)